James Henry Alesia (July 16, 1934 – July 24, 2003) was a United States district judge of the United States District Court for the Northern District of Illinois.

Education and career

Born in Chicago, Illinois, Alesia received a Bachelor of Science from Loyola University Chicago in 1956 and a Juris Doctor from Chicago-Kent College of Law in 1960. He was in private practice in Chicago Heights from 1960 to 1963, and was then an attorney for the Chicago and North Western Transportation Company from 1963 to 1970, returning to private practice in Minneapolis, Minnesota from 1970 to 1971. He was an Assistant United States Attorney of the Northern District of Illinois from 1971 to 1973. He was trial counsel to the Chessie System in 1973. He was an Administrative Law Judge for the United States Department of Health and Human Services, Social Security Administration from 1973 to 1980, and for the Occupational Safety and Health Review Commission from 1980 to 1982. He then returned to private practice in Chicago, from 1982 to 1987.

Federal judicial service

On February 2, 1987, Alesia was nominated by President Ronald Reagan to a seat on the United States District Court for the Northern District of Illinois vacated by George N. Leighton. Alesia was confirmed by the United States Senate on May 19, 1987, and received his commission on May 20, 1987. He assumed senior status due to a certified disability on February 1, 1998, serving in that capacity until his death of a heart attack, in Chicago.

References

Sources
 

1934 births
2003 deaths
Illinois Institute of Technology alumni
Illinois lawyers
Judges of the United States District Court for the Northern District of Illinois
Loyola University Chicago alumni
Minnesota lawyers
United States district court judges appointed by Ronald Reagan
20th-century American judges
Assistant United States Attorneys